Mynbayevo (Myñbaev), is a village in Zhambyl District of Almaty Region, in south-eastern Kazakhstan.

References

Populated places in Almaty Region